Thomas Enger (born November 21, 1973 in Oslo) is a Norwegian writer and journalist. He grew up in Jessheim, but is now living in Oslo with his cohabitant and two children. He is a trained journalist and worked for Nettavisen for nine years. Thomas Enger has also taken sports foundation studies and history of intermediate subjects. He also composes music.

He debuted with the book "Skinndød" in 2010. It was the first stand-alone book in a series of five books about the journalist Henning Juul. The series has since been sold to 30 countries and the book was nominated for eDunnit Award 2012 under CrimeFest 2012. He has won "uPrisen" twice, first in 2014 for The evil legacy, then in 2018 for "Killer instinkt".

Novels
Burned
Pierced
Scarred
Cursed
Killed

References 

Living people
Norwegian crime fiction writers
1973 births
People from Jessheim